Laredo Sound is a sound on the Central Coast of British Columbia, Canada, located on the west side of Price Island.

It is the namesake of CCGS Laredo Sound, a  SAR vessel operated by the Canadian Coast Guard.

References

Central Coast of British Columbia
Sounds of British Columbia